Mtg is as an abbreviation for the words "meeting" and "mortgage".

MTG may also refer to:

Businesses and organizations
 Mağusa Türk Gücü S.K., a Turkish Cypriot sports club
 Maria-Theresia-Gymnasium, a Munich school for gifted students
 Metalogenia, a ground engaging tools company based in Spain
 Metro Tunneling Group, joint venture of Five Companies
 Modern Times Group, a Swedish media company and owner of Viasat and Metro International

Science and technology
 Methanol to gasoline, a process for producing liquid hydrocarbons from methanol
 Middle temporal gyrus, a region in the brain
 Meteosat Third Generation, geostationary meteorological satellites built for EUMETSAT
Monothioglycerol, a thiol used in mass spectrometry and cell culturing

Other
 Magic: The Gathering, a trading card game
 Marjorie Taylor Greene (born 1974), Republican member of the United States House of Representatives
 MTG Hawke's Bay, a museum, art gallery and theatre in New Zealand
 Mind the Gap, a train announcement
 Mottingham railway station, London, England, National Rail station code
 Man the Guns, an expansion for the strategy game Hearts of Iron IV